Embutido, or embotido, is a Philippine meatloaf made with ground pork and stuffed with hard-boiled eggs and sliced ham or various sausages. It is traditionally wrapped in aluminum foil and steamed, though it can also be baked.

Embutido is commonly prepared during Christmas, fiestas, and other special occasions. It can be served hot or chilled, and is usually dipped in banana ketchup or some other type of sweet sauce.

Despite the Spanish name, the dish is derived from the American meatloaf. The name is usually translated as Filipino meatloaf.

Origins
The name of the dish in the Philippines originally referred to embutido, the Spanish word for sausage. Dried sausages are now known under the general terms longganisa or chorizo in the Philippines, with the term embutido used for the meatloaf dish.

The dish itself originates from the American meatloaf, introduced during the American colonial period of the Philippines (1898–1946). This was due to the expansion of the American canning industry and the influx of processed meat and other canned goods to the islands. Canned products were still a novelty at the time, and were adapted into various recipes by Filipino families.

Description

Embutido is made by mixing ground pork with bread crumbs or shredded white bread, raisins, minced carrots, sautéed onions and garlic, seasoned with salt and black pepper to taste. Various other ingredients can also be added to the mixture, including sweet pickle relish, cheese, pineapple chunks, and sliced pimiento or bell peppers. The mixture is then placed on aluminum foil. Hard-boiled eggs are placed lengthwise on it, along with sliced ham, Vienna sausages, longganisa sausages, or even hotdogs. The arrangement is covered with more ground pork mixture, carefully wrapped completely with the aluminum foil, rolled into a cylinder and steamed.

The embutido is usually sliced; it can be sliced while hot, but it is more usual to chill it so that it is less likely to disintegrate when slicing. It can be frozen for storage. Cold embutido can be fried before serving. It is traditionally eaten with white rice and dipped into banana ketchup, sweet chili sauce, or some other sweet sauce.

Embutido differs from the American meatloaf in that it is usually steamed, although it can be baked; and it is made with ground pork rather than ground beef, though modern variants can use beef or beef and pork mixtures.

Similar dishes
Embutido looks like and uses similar ingredients to another Filipino dish, the morcón (which is also different from the original Spanish morcón, a type of sausage). However they are very different dishes. The Filipino morcón is a beef roulade stuffed with eggs, ham, sausages, and pickled cucumber. It is cooked by frying and stewing, rather than steaming or baking.

See also
Hardinera
Everlasting
Filipino spaghetti
Scotch egg
Spam
Tapa
Tocino
List of pork dishes

References

Philippine cuisine
Pork dishes
Steamed foods